Philippine President Rodrigo Duterte signed Executive Order No. 02, also known as the Freedom of Information (FOI) Program, on July 23, 2016, in Davao City. The executive order established the first freedom of information (FOI) Program in the Philippines covering all government offices under the Executive Branch. It requires all executive departments, agencies, bureaus, and offices to disclose public records, contracts, transactions, and any information requested by a member of the public, except for matters affecting national security and other information that falls under the inventory of exceptions issued by Executive Secretary Salvador Medialdea. The landmark order was signed two days before Duterte delivered his first State of the Nation Address and just three weeks after he assumed the presidency on June 30, 2016.

Provisions of Executive Order No. 02, s. 2016

The FOI Executive Order provides for full public disclosure of all government records involving public interest, and upholds the constitutional right of people to information on matters of public concern.

The Order states:

The Order defines "information" to include any

The law expansively defines "official records" as "information produced or received by a public officer or employee, or by a government office in an official capacity or pursuant to a public function or duty," while "public records" refer to "information required by laws, executive orders, rules, or regulations to be entered, kept and made publicly available by a government office." It also emphasizes the obligation of all public officials to file and make available for scrutiny their Statement of Assets, Liabilities and Net worth in accordance with existing laws, jurisprudence, and implementing rules and regulations (IRR) of the Order.

The Order covers the national government and all its offices, departments, bureaus, and instrumentalities, including Government-Owned and/or -Controlled Corporations (GOCCs) and State Universities and Colleges (SUCs). It also encourages all local government units (LGUs) to observe and be guided by this Order.

Inventory of FOI Exceptions 
The Order instructs the Department of Justice (DOJ) and the Office of the Solicitor General (OSG) to prepare and submit an inventory of information that falls under any of the exceptions enshrined in the Constitution, existing laws or jurisprudence, within 30 days. It adds that the inventory of exceptions shall be periodically updated to "properly reflect any change in existing laws and jurisprudence."

On August 22, 2016, the DOJ and OSG submitted a list of 166 exceptions, 158 of which are "exceptions to FOI" and six (6) more listed as "other exceptions." The draft list includes information that "directly relates to national security and internal or external defense of the state;" matters of foreign affairs which "could affect ongoing bilateral or multilateral negotiations;" law enforcement matters; and proceedings and investigations being conducted by public authorities.

It also lists as exception information that might endanger a person's life or safety, such as medical records, bank deposits, and other information considered as privileged communication in legal proceedings by law or by the rules of court. Presidential Communications Operations Office (PCOO) Secretary Jose Ruperto Martin Andanar said the draft list of exceptions would still be reviewed by the Office of the Deputy Executive Secretary for Legal Affairs.

When the Order took effect on November 24, 2016, the 166 exceptions submitted by the DOJ and OSG were categorized into nine (9) exceptions, as follows:

 1. Information covered by Executive privilege;
 2. Privileged information relating to national security, defense or international relations;
 3. Information concerning law enforcement and protection of public and personal safety;
 4. Information deemed confidential for the protection of the privacy of persons and certain individuals such as minors, victims of crimes, or the accused;
 5. Information, documents or records known by reason of official capacity and are deemed as confidential, including those submitted or disclosed by entities to government agencies, tribunals, boards, or officers, in relation to the performance of their functions, or to inquiries or investigation conducted by them in the exercise of their administrative, regulatory, or quasi-judicial powers;
 6. Prejudicial premature disclosure;
 7. Records of proceedings or information from proceedings which, pursuant to law or relevant rules and regulations, are treated as confidential or privileged;
 8. Matters considered confidential under banking and finance laws, and their amendatory laws; and
 9. Other exceptions to the right to information under laws, jurisprudence, and IRR.

People's FOI Manual
The Order directs all government offices under the Executive Branch to prepare and submit their own People's FOI Manual within 120 days upon its effectivity. It shall include:
As of August 2018, the following agencies have submitted their People's FOI Manuals:

 100% or 190 out of 190 National Government Agencies (NGAs); 
 85% or 100 out of 118 GOCCs; 
 90% or 101 out of 112 SUCs; and 
 34% or 176 out of 521 Local Water Districts (LWDs).

Process of Requesting Information
Filipino citizens may access government information either through the standard (paper-based) platform or the Electronic FOI (eFOI) Portal.

The request for access to a government document by any member of the public shall be in writing and must include the name and contact information of the requesting party, a valid proof of his identification, the specific information being requested, and the reason or purpose for the request for information. Upon receiving the application, the government official must provide reasonable assistance to the requesting party, and shall respond and notify the applicant of their decision in relation to the request within 15 working days of receiving the request. If access has been denied wholly or in part, reasons must be provided to the applicant. The oOder states: "No request for information shall be denied unless it clearly falls under any of the exceptions listed in the inventory or updated inventory of exceptions."

The 15 working day response period may be extended to additional 20 working days, in cases where the information being requested requires extensive research or examination of voluminous records. The response period may also be prolonged in the event of unexpected disruption to government services. The government official is then required to notify the applicant of the extension. Failure to notify the requesting party of the action taken on the request within the response period will be viewed as a denial of the request.

Sanctions for Non-Compliance 
Pursuant to the Order, failure to comply with its provisions may be a ground for administrative and disciplinary sanctions against any erring public officer based on the Revised Rules on Administrative Cases in the Civil Service.

Remedies in Case of Denial 
A person whose request for access to information has been denied may file an appeal to the Central Appeals and Review Committee of the concerned agency.

Written appeal must be filed by the same person making the request within 15 calendar days from the notice of denial or from the lapse of the period to respond to the request. The appeal shall be decided within 30 working days from the filing of said written appeal. Failure of such person or office to decide within the period shall be deemed a denial of the appeal.

Upon exhaustion of administrative appeal remedies, the requesting party may file the appropriate judicial action in accordance with the Rules of Court.

The Freedom of Information – Project Management Office 
Through Memorandum Order No. 10, s. 2016, the Office of the Executive Secretary (OES) mandated the PCOO to act as the lead implementing agency for the FOI Program. To operationalize this, the PCOO established the Freedom of Information – Project Management Office (FOI-PMO) through PCOO Department Order No. 18, s. 2017.

The vision of the FOI-PMO is to regain public trust by revolutionizing how the government discloses information to the citizens and ensuring that government agencies respond to citizen concerns and provide the information they need, all within 15 to 35 working days.

Outside the Executive Branch 
Although the Order only covers agencies under the Executive Branch, LGUs and other government agencies outside the Executive Branch are encouraged to observe and be guided by the Order Ref.

As of August 2018, the following offices have submitted their FOI Manuals either in paper and/or digital format, and complied with the provisions in the said Order:

 Office of the Ombudsman (OMB) News Art
 Commission on Audit News Art

Localizing the FOI Program 
Based on a thorough review of the top requested information from government agencies, it has been found that there is a high demand for local, granular information, News Art such as Internal Revenue Allotments, Regional Development Plans, and information on the Local Government Support Fund. Ref

To address this, the PCOO has partnered with the Department of the Interior and Local Government (DILG) to establish measures to promote the issuance of local FOI Ordinances. The local FOI Ordinance serves as the local counterpart of the Order and sets the standards in providing access to information under the jurisdiction of LGUs. News Art

A PCOO-DILG Joint Memorandum Circular is currently being drafted to further push and support LGUs in the local implementation of the program. News Art

As of August 2018, the following LGUs have already passed their own local FOI Ordinances:

 City Government of Laoag; News Art
 Provincial Government of Ilocos Norte; News Art
 Municipal Government of San Nicolas; Att
 Provincial Government of Bohol; News Art and
 Provincial Government of Masbate. News Art

The FOI Portal 

The Electronic Freedom of Information (eFOI) website was launched on November 25, 2016. It is an online request platform open to the public that facilitates requests for data and information from various government agencies.

The online Portal was initially limited to 15 government agencies in its beta phase, namely the PCOO, Philippine Statistics Authority (PSA), Department of Budget and Management (DBM), Department of Information and Communications Technology (DICT), Presidential Commission on Good Government (PCGG), National Archives of the Philippines (NAP), Department of Transportation (DOTr), Department of Finance (DOF), DOJ, Public Attorney's Office (PAO), Office of the Government Corporate Counsel (OGCC), OSG, Philippine National Police (PNP), Department of Health (DOH), and PhilHealth.

As of January 2022, the eFOI website currently has around 92,359 requests for information lodged for 547 government agencies that are on board the portal.

References

External links
 Executive Order No. 02, s. 2016
 eFOI – Electronic Freedom of Information

Legal history of the Philippines
2016 in the Philippines
Presidency of Rodrigo Duterte
002-s2016
Freedom of information